Matzner may refer to:

35237 Matzner, a minor planet. See Meanings of minor planet names: 35001–36000#237
Stefan Matzner (born 1993), Austrian track cyclist
Caren Matzner or Caren Lissner, American novelist, essayist, and newspaper editor